Marvin Kent (September 21, 1816 – December 10, 1908) was a railroad president, politician, and businessman from Portage County, Ohio, United States, best known as the namesake of the city of Kent, Ohio, which was previously known as Franklin Mills.

Biography
Marvin Kent was born in Ravenna, Ohio, and was heavily involved in the business dealings of his father Zenas Kent from a very young age.  During the 1860s he was instrumental in establishing the Atlantic and Great Western Railroad and having the railroad shops located in the village of Franklin Mills.  The village was named after him shortly thereafter in 1864. Kent also served as a bank president and as an Ohio state senator from the Republican party. He died in Kent, Ohio, in 1908.

Relatives
Kent's father Zenas had several business ventures during the 1830s-1850s in Franklin Mills and briefly operated a tannery with John Brown.  He also had considerable land holdings and built a four-story commercial block in what is now downtown Kent in 1837 that was said to have been the tallest building in Ohio at the time.  He eventually would relocate to Franklin Mills in 1851. Marvin Kent had two sons: Henry Lewis Kent and William Stewart Kent.  Henry was the father of two daughters and the grandfather of Marvin Kent Curtis. William Kent played a key role in the establishment of Kent State University in 1910 by donating the land for the original campus.

References

1816 births
1908 deaths
19th-century American railroad executives
American people of Dutch descent
Ohio state senators
People from Kent, Ohio
History of Kent, Ohio
19th-century American politicians